Joaquín del Moral Sánchez (born 31 May 1991), commonly known as Joaqui, is a Spanish footballer who plays for Xerez Deportivo FC as a central defender.

Club career
Born in Chipiona, Province of Cádiz, Andalusia, Joaqui finished his formation with Xerez CD. He made his debut as a senior with the reserves in 2010, representing them in the regional leagues.

Joaqui made his official debut for the Andalusians' first team on 5 May 2012, playing the last 11 minutes of a 1–2 away loss against SD Huesca in the Segunda División. On 9 August 2013 he signed with CF Pobla de Mafumet of the Tercera División.

On 14 July 2016, Joaqui joined Segunda División B club Atlético Sanluqueño CF. The following 23 January, he moved to amateurs Xerez Deportivo FC.

References

External links
 
 
 
 

1991 births
Living people
Spanish footballers
Footballers from Andalusia
Association football defenders
Segunda División players
Segunda División B players
Tercera División players
Xerez CD B players
Xerez CD footballers
CF Pobla de Mafumet footballers
Atlético Sanluqueño CF players
Xerez Deportivo FC footballers
Arcos CF players